The Berlin Brothersvalley School District covers New Baltimore and Allegheny Township, Fairhope Township and Northampton Township in Somerset County, Pennsylvania.  The school district consists of three schools all connected by a tunnel. The district encompasses 165.5 square miles. According to a 2006 local census, it serves a resident population of 5,633.

Schools

References

External links 
Berlin's school site

School districts in Somerset County, Pennsylvania